The 20th Toronto Film Critics Association Awards, honoring the best in film for 2016, were awarded on December 11, 2016, with the exception of the award for Best Canadian Film, which was presented on January 10, 2017.

The winner of the award for Best Canadian Film was Hugh Gibson for his documentary film The Stairs. Gibson received a prize of $100,000, with runners-up Kazik Radwanski and Matt Johnson each awarded $5,000. Unusually, however, the three directors revealed that they had agreed to pool the entire $110,000 in prize money, and split it equally among all three regardless of which film won.

Winners

References

2015
2016 film awards
2016 in Toronto
2016 in Canadian cinema